My Baby's Daddy is a 2004 American comedy film, directed by Cheryl Dunye.

Plot
Childhood friends Lonnie, G, and Dominic have a rude awakening when they find out their girlfriends are pregnant. Lonnie and G have sons names Carver and Bruce-Leroy, and Dominic has a daughter named Jasmine.

Each have their own unique set of problems; Lonnie's girlfriend Rolonda is more interested in partying than being a mother; Dominic discovers that his girlfriend Nia is a lesbian and has fallen in love with her midwife; while G, an aspiring boxer, is unable to fully commit to his girlfriend XiXi.

Throughout the movie, all three men, particularly G and Dominic, are determined to continue their normal way of living and be fathers at the same time. Lonnie is a garbage man among other part-time jobs, G works in the store Xixi's family runs, and Dominic is managing a pair of white rappers.

After they momentarily lose their kids during a party they threw, they realize how much their kids depend on them, and gradually become responsible fathers. Lonnie falls in love with a woman from a Mommy and Me class named Brandy who he treats badly on date, due to believing she wouldn't like the real him. Nia reveals to Dominic she's a lesbian and feels he is too involved in his career to ever be a father. G's cousin No Good robs a store to help him get the supplies for his son and Xixi feels he was in on it and takes Bruce-Leroy away from him.

After all three are given a talking to by Lonnie's Uncle Virgil, they realize how much they love their kids and what they have to do. Lonnie apologizes to Brandy, but he stays true to himself, and she forgives him, then he storms to Rolonda's house and takes Carver with him, while criticizing her for having a baby to get child support payments and knocks out her cousin "Big Swoll". Dominic goes to Nia and tells her how much he loves Jasmine and how he needs to be a part of her life. G's girlfriend's father tells him a story of being in the Triads before he had his daughter and realized how much his family meant to him, leading to G proposing to Xixi.

At the end of the movie, it is revealed that Lonnie and Brandy get married. Lonnie has also achieved his dream of becoming a successful inventor; Dominic started a children's music album; and G and his father-in-law open a martial arts/boxing studio called The Mo Fo Dojo. No Good, after learning of organic foods, goes on to become a successful food show personality called The Organic Gangster. They lastly toast to great babies' daddies. In the end, they realize that three little babies turned them into three grown men.

Selected cast

Eddie Griffin – Lonnie, one of the four main characters
Anthony Anderson – G, the second of the four main characters and the narrator
Michael Imperioli – Dominic, the third of the four main characters
Method Man – No Good (Randall), G's ex con cousin, and the last of the four main characters
Paula Jai Parker – Rolonda, Lonnie's golddigging girlfriend
Bai Ling – XiXi
Joanna Bacalso – Nia
Amy Sedaris – Annabelle
Marsha Thomason – Brandy
Bobb'e J. Thompson – Lil' Tupac
Tommy "Tiny" Lister – Drive By
John Amos – Uncle Virgil
Bryan Ho - Dang Ling, XiXi little brother

Production
Principal Photography took place from September 9 to November 4, 2002 in Toronto, Ontario, Canada while exterior shots were filmed in Philadelphia, Pennsylvania.

Reception
This movie has a 6% approval rating on Rotten Tomatoes based on 52 reviews of which only three were fresh, with an average rating of 2.9/10. The site's consensus reads, "Full of poop jokes, broad racial stereotyping, and other tired gags, My Baby's Daddy makes the absolute least of a decent premise". On Metacritic, the film has a score of 23 out of 100 based on 15 critics, indicating "generally unfavorable reviews".

References

External links
 
 
 
 
 

2004 films
2004 comedy films
American comedy films
Films scored by Richard Gibbs
Miramax films
2000s English-language films
2000s American films